Tiago Henrique Gonçalves or simply Tiago Maringá (born February 6, 1982 in Ribeirão Preto), is a Brazilian attacking midfielder. He currently plays for Grêmio Metropolitano.

Honours
French League: 2003
Paraná State League: 2007

External links
 sambafoot
 furacao

1982 births
AJ Auxerre players
Associação Ferroviária de Esportes players
Brazilian footballers
Clube Atlético Bragantino players
Club Athletico Paranaense players
Living people
Sociedade Esportiva Palmeiras players
Sport Club Corinthians Paulista players
Association football goalkeepers
People from Ribeirão Preto
Footballers from São Paulo (state)